The Steeple Grange Light Railway is a narrow-gauge, heritage railway visitor attraction near Wirksworth in Derbyshire, UK. It uses industrial locomotives and rolling stock from disused mines, quarries, and steelworks around the country.

The line
The line features a steep 1:27 (3.7 %) gradient incline from the back of the engine shed to the station near Middleton by Wirksworth which has a pathway leading to Main Street. At Dark Lane there is a carriage and wagon shed which houses the railway's coaching stock alongside a few locomotives that are under maintenance and various maintenance wagons.

The railway has reached its goal of extending the line up from the Recreation Ground station, towards Lawson's Loop (a runaround siding for trains to pass one another) past the level crossing. Middleton station was reached in 2019 with trains running regularly to this station. The station also has a ballast chute on its right-hand side when ascending the steep grade, used to pour ballast from wheelbarrows into the hopper wagon Leonard. The level crossing up from Lawson's Loop is operated by the guard from the passing train, raising flags at a 90-degree angle with the red flag straight out to warn oncoming vehicles and the yellow flag above the guard's head to allow the train to pass by safely.

Locomotives
The SGLR has two operational passenger locomotives, two permanent way/works locomotives and many others under restoration.

Greenbat

Greenbat incorporated a folding cab, to allow the locomotive to fit down small mineshafts. It was ordered by Halesowen Steel Co, who specifically requested the cab be fixed. Greenbat herself has never been underground, working in various steel mills.

Greenbat was preserved by Adrian Booth, who passed it on to the SGLR when the line was in its infancy. She was fitted with air braking, and coupled to an ex-NCB manrider has provided nearly 15 years of service. In 2005 she received new batteries, the old ones having last 15 years out of a lifespan of 10. Greenbat is the primary use locomotive at the railway, being used for normal day trips, private parties and Santa Specials (banked by ZM32 Horwich on these days).

Motor: 1× GB type T2
Drive: worm and wheel to each axle
Voltage: 48 V, Lead acid batteries

ZM32 Horwich

ZM32 Horwich was built in 1957 and was given the works number of 416214. This locomotive is the only  gauge Ruston and Hornsby LAT in existence. She was bought by British Railways to work at their Horwich works in Lancashire, and was preserved alongside Wren at the National Railway Museum. When she was sold off, she was going to be sent to a banana plantation in South America. However, she languished in Liverpool docks until bought for the Gloddfa Ganol museum in Wales. When Gloddfa Ganol closed, she was bought by an SGLR member, restored to  gauge and fitted with airbraking.

A gearbox failure led to her being taken to Dorothea Restorations for a complete overhaul. She is now back on the line, in lined out BR green, and used alternately with Greenbat. She was recently voted the most popular non-steam narrow gauge locomotive .

This locomotive is regularly used a banker to help locomotive Greenbat up the line to Santa's Grotto on Santa Special weekends in December.

Engine: Ruston and Hornsby  diesel
Transmission: Hydraulic, 2 gear box

Hudson
This locomotive is quite an oddity, being home built. The SGLR was originally started with stock from Ladywash Mine, near Eyam in Derbyshire. The only locomotive was No.6, which was in a very poor, nonfunctioning state. Before Greenbat arrived, it was decided that one of the four wheel Ladywash Hudson manriders should be converted to a locomotive. This was done by Alwyn Ambrey in 1988, using a Villiers engine and transmission from a cricket pitch roller. It resulted in being able to seat 2 passengers and the driver. The drive was geared too highly for the engine to cope with the gradient on the line. This, and the engine being in poor state, meant it was used very little. The locomotive was worked on by various people in the late 1990s, finally being finished by J Scott in 2003. Scott refurbished the engine, thus largely solving the underpowering problem, and fitted a much better braking system. Two years later, a new engine was found. It is basically the same as the old one, but has a 3:1 reduction gearbox fitted. Although there is still some tinkering to be done, this addition has greatly improved the locomotives haulage. The locomotive is not in regular use because of its insufficient haulage capacity and not having the required horsepower to climb the grade before Middleton station.

Engine: 3½ HP Villiers Mk25 with reduction box
Transmission: Cup and cone reversing clutch and chain drive

Claytons
The railway has three battery Claytons of similar designs in private ownership. They were both bought directly from industrial use. Peggy has recently been restored to operating condition, and is running using the redundant 15-year-old batteries from Greenbat. Peggy is fitted with a cam-contactor controller and resistances for speed control. Peggy serves as the primary locomotive for work trains on the SGLR, taking volunteers up and down the line to do rail and infrastructure maintenance, often seen with the tool wagon being shunted back and forth. Peggy also works on the branchline trains down into the quarry, interchanging with Peter every so often.  

Lady Margorie is a compact ,  Clayton. Designed to work in  diameter sewer pipes, she even has a "barn roof" style battery box top to make maximum use of confined space. She has an electronic controller, as opposed to the more usual resistance type. On 20 May 2012 Lady Margorie was renamed Peter after the late Peter Sellers, the society chairman.

Ladywash Mine No.6
This was the first locomotive on the railway, bought with a large amount of track and rolling stock from Ladywash Mine, near Eyam in Derbyshire.

She spent all her working life at Ladywash, acquiring some interesting but highly useful modifications – her works photo appears in Adrian Booth's book on Greenwood and Batley, and is quite interesting to contrast with her current form. She was also fitted with a thyristor controller, which was removed before being sold.

She arrived at the SGLR in a poor state of repair which, along with the lack of controller, meant she was dumped around various sidings untouched. Eventually she was bought in 2004, and work finally started on her restoration. Following removal from the site for shotblasting, the frames have been repainted and simultaneously the axleboxes overhauled. Now back on site, she is currently a rolling chassis with brake gear being overhauled. Where necessary, new parts are being machined by her owner. Work is also currently underway on the manufacture of a replacement controller, making use of contactors and resistances from other electrical machines. Future work includes overhaul of the two traction motors, some attention to one of the gearboxes and re-cabling prior to reassembly.

Motors: 2× GB type T2
Batteries: 60V lead-acid
Weight: 3 tons new, 3¼–3½ tons with modifications

See also
 List of British heritage and private railways
 British narrow gauge railways

References

External links

The Steeple Grange Light Railway Official site

Heritage railways in Derbyshire
18 in gauge railways in England
Railway lines opened in 1985
Tourist attractions of the Peak District
Wirksworth